ChinaCast Education Corporation is a leading for-profit, post-secondary education and e-learning services provider in the People's Republic of China. Established in 1999, the Company provides its post-secondary degree programs through its 80% ownership in the holding company of the Foreign Trade and Business College (FTBC) of Chongqing Normal University.  The Company provides its e-learning services to post-secondary institutions, K-12 schools, government agencies and corporate enterprises via its nationwide satellite broadband network.  The company listed on the NASDAQ Global Market Exchange with the ticker symbol CAST on October 29, 2007.

History/Major Corporate Milestones
The Company was established in 1999 as ChinaCast Communications Limited (CCL) and subsequently raised a Series A venture capital round which included investors Hughes Network Systems and Intel Capital.  In May 2004, the Company was renamed ChinaCast Communications Holdings Limited (CCH) and made an initial public offering on the Singapore Stock Exchange.  On December 22, 2006, Great Wall Acquisition Corporation, a US-listed (stock symbol OTC:GWAQ) Special Purpose Acquisition Company, completed the 100% acquisition via tender offer of CCH in a reverse merger transaction. Great Wall Acquisition Corporation was then renamed ChinaCast Education Corporation in early 2007 (stock symbol OTC:CEUC) and then listed on the NASDAQ Global Market Exchange (stock symbol NASDAQ:CAST) on October 29, 2007.  In April 2008, the Company completed the acquisition of 80% of the holding company of the Foreign Trade and Business College of Chongqing Normal University.

Business services
Two principal business lines: 
 E-Learning services to post-secondary institutions, K-12 schools, government agencies and corporate enterprises
 Post-secondary education through the Foreign Trade and Business College (FTBC) of Chongqing Normal University.

E-Learning Services
The Company with its subsidiaries and variable interest entities, provides e-learning education services via its nationwide satellite broadband network to post-secondary education institutions, K-12 schools, government agencies and corporate enterprises. These services include interactive distance learning applications, multimedia education content delivery, vocational/career training courses and English language training through its Daily English Language training centers. As of September 2008, the Company has provided its e-learning services to over 15 state-owned universities, 6,500 K-12 schools and over 300 government and corporate enterprise locations throughout China.

Post-secondary education
The Company provides post-secondary education services through the Foreign Trade and Business College (FTBC) of Chongqing Normal University. The college is an independent, for-profit, private university and is located in the southwest city of Chongqing, China’s largest municipality in population and in area. Chongqing has a population of 31 million and the adjacent province, Sichuan, has a population of 82 million. FTBC offers four-year bachelor's degree and two-year diploma programs in finance, economics, trade, tourism, advertising, IT, music and foreign languages, all of which are fully accredited by the Ministry of Education. For the academic year starting September 2008, the college had over 11,000 students enrolled. FTBC has an on-campus student capacity of 15,000 students which it anticipates to reach in 2011.

Education companies of China